Countess Louise of Stolberg-Wernigerode (24 November 1771 at Wernigerode Castle – 8 June 1856 in Groß Krauschen) was abbess of Drübeck Abbey.

Louise was a member of the House of Stolberg, from the Harz area.  She was the second eldest daughter of Count Christian Frederick of Stolberg-Wernigerode and his wife Auguste Eleonore of Stolberg-Stolberg.  She was an older sister of Henry of Stolberg-Wernigerode.

From 1797 to 1800, she was abbess of Drübeck Abbey.  On 21 December 1807, she left the abbey to marry Moritz Haubold von Schönberg.  She moved to his estate in Groß Krauschen, which is now in Poland and called Gmina Bolesławiec.  She died there in 1856.

References

Secular abbesses
House of Stolberg
1771 births
1856 deaths
18th-century German people
19th-century German people